KotriSain is a small village in the Pauri Garhwal district of the Indian state of Uttarakhand. The population of KotriSain is around 500. It covers a wide geographical area, which is hilly and a valley surrounded by Corbett Tiger Reserve.

The main source of income is agriculture. The village has a primary and secondary school. Children go to Rikhnikhal/Barkhet for senior schooling.

Villages in Pauri Garhwal district